XETLA-AM/XHPBSD-FM (La Voz de la Mixteca – "The Voice of La Mixteca") is an indigenous community radio station that broadcasts in Spanish, Mixtec and Triqui from Tlaxiaco in the Mexican state of Oaxaca. It is run by the Cultural Indigenist Broadcasting System (SRCI) of the National Commission for the Development of Indigenous Peoples (CDI) and broadcasts from studios in the Barrio San Diego neighborhood of Tlaxiaco.

External links
XETLA website

References

Indigenous peoples of Oaxaca
Sistema de Radiodifusoras Culturales Indígenas
Radio stations in Oaxaca
Mixtec-language radio stations
Trique-language radio stations
Radio stations established in 1982